Giulio Rusconi (born 1885, date of death unknown) was an Italian fencer. He competed in the individual sabre event at the 1920 Summer Olympics.

References

1885 births
Year of death missing
Italian male fencers
Olympic fencers of Italy
Fencers at the 1920 Summer Olympics